Polrussia is an extinct genus of iguanian lizards dating to the Late Cretaceous epoch, found in what is now Mongolia. It belongs to a group of extinct iguanians called Gobiguania that was endemic to the Gobi Desert during the Late Cretaceous. The type species Polrussia mongoliensis was named in 1991 on the basis of a skull found in the Barun Goyot Formation. The genus name refers to the Polish and Russian paleontologists who worked together to find and describe the material. Polrussia has a short skull, slightly pointed and flattened snout, and large eye sockets. The teeth each have one cusp, as opposed to the multiple cusps seen in some other gobiguanians.

Below is a cladogram from Daza et al. (2012) showing the phylogenetic relationships of Polrussia:

References

Cretaceous lizards
Late Cretaceous reptiles of Asia
Fossil taxa described in 1991
Prehistoric lizard genera